Mount Kaweah is a mountain in California's Sequoia National Park and forms part of the Kaweah Peaks Ridge, a spur of the Great Western Divide which extends south from Triple Divide Peak.

Name
The peak was named for the Kaweah River which has its headwaters to the west of the Kaweah Peaks Ridge. The Kaweahs, however, drain into the Kern River. The Kaweah River was named for the Kawai (or Gā'wia) tribe, members of the Yokuts people. The Yokuts were once known as Mariposa.

Foxtail Pine
A rare pine, the Foxtail Pine, lives on the southern slopes of Mount Kaweah.

Highest mountain in the southwest Sierra
Mount Kaweah is the highest mountain in the southwest Sierra.

See also
 List of mountain peaks of California

References

External links

Mountains of Tulare County, California
Mountains of Sequoia National Park
Mount Kaweah
Mountains of Northern California